Costești is a town in Argeș County, Romania.

Costești may also refer to the following places:

Romania
 Costești, Buzău, a commune in Buzău County
 Costești, Iași, a commune in Iași County
 Costești, Vâlcea, a commune in Vâlcea County
 Costești, Vaslui, a commune in Vaslui County
 Costești, a village in the commune Albac, Alba County
 Costești, a village in the commune Poiana Vadului, Alba County
 Costești, a village in the commune Cotmeana, Argeș County
 Costești, a village in the commune Răchiți, Botoșani County
 Costești, a village in the commune Fieni, Dâmbovița County
 Costești, a village in the commune Aninoasa, Gorj 
 Costești, a village in the commune Orăștioara de Sus, Hunedoara County
 Costești, a village in the commune Balta, Mehedinți County
 Costeștii din Vale, a commune in Dâmbovița County
 Costești-Vâlsan, a village in the commune Mușătești, Argeș County
 Costești (river), a tributary of the Bistrița in Vâlcea County

Moldova
Costești, Moldova, a city in Rîșcani district
Costești, Ialoveni
 Costești, Ivanovca, Hîncești

Ukraine
Costești, the Romanian name for Kostyntsi

See also 
 Coasta (disambiguation)